Gilbert de Greenlaw (1354–1421) was a medieval Bishop of Aberdeen and Bishop-elect of St. Andrews. He was a Licentiate in the Arts, and had been a canon of Bishopric of Moray by the late 1370s, before being provided by Avignon Pope Clement VII the church of Liston in the Bishopric of St. Andrews in 1379. By the later 1380s, he was in the diocese of Aberdeen. In 1389, he was elected to hold the bishopric of Aberdeen, a position to which he was consecrated in 1390. Gilbert subsequently went on to hold the position of Chancellor of Scotland for many years, albeit in an interrupted manner. Gilbert was subsequently postulated to the more prestigious bishopric of St. Andrews after the death of Walter de Danyelston, its previous Bishop-elect. However, Avignon Pope Benedict XIII quashed the postulation, and chose Henry Wardlaw in his stead. Gilbert, then, remained Bishop of Aberdeen, and died in 1421.

References
Dowden, John, The Bishops of Scotland, ed. J. Maitland Thomson, (Glasgow, 1912)

1354 births
1421 deaths
University of Paris alumni
Bishops of Aberdeen
Bishops of St Andrews
Lord chancellors of Scotland
14th-century Scottish Roman Catholic bishops
15th-century Scottish Roman Catholic bishops
Kingdom of Scotland expatriates in France